Michael Cordial (born 1982) is an Irish former hurler. At club level he played with Shinrone and was also a member of the Wexford senior hurling team.

Playing career

Cordial first played hurling at juvenile and underage levels with the Shinrone club, before joining the club's top adult team. He first appeared on the inter-county scene with the Offaly minor team that won the Leinster Championship in 2000. Cordial was drafted onto the Offaly senior hurling team in 2002. Over the course of the following decade he was a regular on the team.

Honours

Wexford
Leinster Minor Hurling Championship: 2000

References

External links
 Michael Cordial league and championship appearances

1982 births
Living people
Shinrone hurlers
Offaly inter-county hurlers
Leinster inter-provincial hurlers